Cataegis celebesensis is a species of sea snail, a marine gastropod mollusk in the family Cataegidae.

Description
The height of the shell attains .

Distribution
This marine species is found in the Makassar Strait, Indonesia

References

 McLean, J.H. & Quinn J.F., 1987. -Cataegis, new genus of three new species from the continental slope (Trochidae: Cataeginae New subfamily). The Nautilus 101(3): 111-116
 Vilvens C. (2016). New records and new species of Cataegis (Gastropoda: Seguenzioidea) from Solomon Islands. Novapex. 17(4): 67-76.

External links
 To Biodiversity Heritage Library (1 publication)
 To Encyclopedia of Life
 To USNM Invertebrate Zoology Mollusca Collection
 To World Register of Marine Species

Cataegis
Gastropods described in 1987